Auric may refer to:

An ion of gold, Au3+
Aurangabad Industrial City (abbrev. AURIC), an industrial city in Maharashtra, India
Georges Auric (1899–1983), French composer
Auric (band), a progressive sludge metal band from Fayetteville, Arkansas
Auric, the currency of the fictional state of the Draka in The Domination series
Auric Godshawk, a character in the Fever Crumb
Auric Goldfinger, a villain from the James Bond film Goldfinger
Auric the Conqueror, an ally of the Zeo Rangers

See also
Aura (disambiguation)
Aurum (disambiguation)